Texas Monthly (stylized as TexasMonthly) is a monthly American magazine headquartered in Downtown Austin, Texas. Texas Monthly was founded in 1973 by Michael R. Levy and has been published by Emmis Publishing, L.P. since 1998 and is now owned by Enterprise Products Co. Texas Monthly chronicles life in contemporary Texas, writing on politics, the environment, industry, and education. The magazine also covers leisure topics such as music, art, dining, and travel. It is a member of the City and Regional Magazine Association (CRMA). In 2019, Texas Monthly was purchased by billionaire Randa Williams. In 2021, Texas Monthly acquired Texas Country Reporter.

Circulation
Texas Monthly has a paid circulation of 300,000 and it has a monthly readership of 2.5 million people—one out of seven Texan adults. Its audience comprises a roughly equal number of men and women, most of whom are between the ages of 30 and 55.

Subject matter
Texas Monthly takes as its premise that Texas began as a distinctive place and remains so. It is the self-appointed arbiter of all things culturally Texan, with past articles on Texas BBQ, the Texas Rangers (including Joaquin Jackson's famous 1994 cover appearance), and Texas musicians.

Texas Monthlys annual "Bum Steer Awards" poke fun at Texas politicians and policies, odd Texas-related news items and personalities from the previous year. Anna Nicole Smith (prior to her death) was a perennial "winner". Other Bum Steer "Hall of Famers" include Ross Perot, Tom DeLay, and Jessica Simpson. It releases biennial lists with explanations of the "Ten Best" and "Ten Worst" Texas state legislators.

Since the establishment of the magazine, barbecue enthusiasts have been among the Texas Monthly staff. The magazine's first article about barbecue in Texas was published in 1973. The magazine often ranks what it considers to be the best barbecue restaurants in Texas. Calvin Trillin of The New Yorker said in 2008 that East Texas barbecue often did not interest the Austin-based staff of the Texas Monthly, who were more focused on Central Texas barbecue.

In December 2021, the magazine signed a three-year first-look deal with HBO and HBO Max.

Headquarters

It has its headquarters at 816 Congress Ave. in Downtown Austin. It occupies a  area on the 17th floor of the building.  it has about 80 employees.

Around 2009 the Texas Monthly headquarters moved to University Park, on the site of the former Concordia University. The headquarters was scheduled to move to its current location in Downtown Austin in the summer of 2011.

Previously the headquarters was in Suite 1600 of 701 Brazos in Downtown Austin.

Awards
The magazine has received ten National Magazine Awards:
 General Excellence—2009, 2003, 1992, 1990
 Public Interest—1996, for "Not What the Doctor Ordered" by Mimi Swartz
 Photography—1990
 Reporting—1985, for "The Man in the Black Hat" (part 1 and 2) by Paul Burka
 Public Service—1980, for "Why Teachers Can't Teach" by Gene Lyons
 Reporting—1979, for a three-part series by Richard West
 Outstanding Editorial Achievement in Special Journalism—1974

Archives
The complete archives of Texas Monthly (1972–present) are located at the Wittliff collections of Southwestern Writers, Texas State University.

Texas Monthly Press
In the 1980s, Texas Monthly Press published such books as Goodbye to a River and Hank the Cowdog and authors such as Bud Shrake, Stephen Harrigan and Gary Cartwright. Gulf Publishing Company purchased Texas Monthly Press in 1989.

References

 . Retrieved Apr. 13, 2005.
 Texas Monthly Awards. Retrieved Apr. 13, 2005.

External links

 
 Texas Monthly Mobile
 Texas Monthly Archives at The Wittliff Collections of Southwestern Writers, Texas State University, San Marcos, TX.

1973 establishments in Texas
Lifestyle magazines published in the United States
Magazines established in 1973
Magazines published in Austin, Texas
Modern liberal magazines published in the United States
Monthly magazines published in the United States
Political magazines published in the United States
Texas culture
Texas literature